Paul Lake (born 1968) is an English former footballer.

Paul Lake may also refer to:

 Paul Lake (cyclist) (born 1970), Australian Paralympic cyclist
 Paul Lake (poet), American poet, essayist and professor at Arkansas Tech University
 Paul Lake (Nova Scotia), Canada
 Paul Lake Provincial Park, British Columbia, Canada

Lake, Paul